The J&K Premier Football League is the top state-level  football league in the Indian state of Jammu and Kashmir, conducted by Jammu and Kashmir Football Association (JKFA) and J&K Sports Council.

History

J&K Premier Football League
The sport was controlled by the Kashmir Olympic Association (KOA) as the governing body of football. In 1964, the Jammu & Kashmir Football Association was formed which took over the reins from KOA and framed a constitution which established itself as the apex body of football in J&K. The Premier Division is organised by JKFA which is the top tier of the state football league. The two bottom-placed teams get relegated to the Super Division league while the top two teams gets promoted to the Premier Division. The A-Division is the third tier while the fourth-tier is the B-Division. The teams which participated in the lowest tier were divided into 12 pools and following the round-robin stage, the top-two teams from each pool progressed to the knock-out stage with the two finalists qualifying to the upper tier.

JKFA Professional League
The JKFA Professional League is the professional league, conducted by Jammu & Kashmir Football Association (JKFA) and J&K Sports Council, was Founded in 2021, with the league is currently contested with 8 teams competing for title and I-League Qualifiers nomination in its inaugural edition.

The inaugural season kicked off on 12 July 2021, with 8 teams competing for the maiden title and qualification for the I-League 2nd Division. The 8 teams will play once against each other in a round-robin format. The Top 2 clubs will be nominated for I-League 2nd Division.

With an idea to bring professional flavour into J&K football, the J&K Football Association (JKFA) launched JKFA Professional (Pro) Football League starting from July 12, 2021. The league would initially run parallel to main top-tier football league of J&K Premier League and with the passage of time is set to turn into completely professional league. JKFA has made it clear that this newly launched league would serve as qualifying tournament for the Second Division I-League organised by All India Football Federation (AIFF).

JKFA recently held meeting with five professional clubs of J&K who had applied for the second division I-League. As JKFA can nominate only two clubs out of five, it was decided to hold qualifying tournament for the teams. Later it was further decided to include three more teams as per AIFF directions to make it a proper Professional Qualifying League.

League structure
There are four divisions in the league under the Jammu & Kashmir Football Association (JKFA), with the J&K Premier Division being the top-most league, followed by three lower tiers.

Teams
A total of 8 teams participated in the league.

Media coverage

Champions

J&K Premier Football League

JKFA Professional League

See also
Jammu & Kashmir Football Association

References

4
Football in Jammu and Kashmir
2021 establishments in Jammu and Kashmir
Sports leagues established in 2021